Rabin Omar (born 21 July 1997) is an Iraqi-Dutch professional footballer who plays for East Fife. Omar has previously played for Annan Athletic, Greenock Morton, Dumbarton, Stirling Albion and Elgin City.

Personal life
Born in Delft, Netherlands, Omar is of Iraqi descent.

Omar has a degree in Pharmacology from the University of Glasgow.

Career
After playing for four seasons in Scottish League Two with Annan Athletic, Omar left to join divisional rivals Elgin City. Two seasons later, Omar made the step-up to the Scottish Championship with Greenock Morton on 5 August 2020.

Omar made his Morton debut in the Scottish League Cup draw against Queen of the South.

In March 2021, Omar joined Scottish League One side Dumbarton on loan until the end of the season.

On 30 June 2021, Omar signed for Scottish League Two side Stirling Albion.

On 7 January 2022, Omar rejoined Elgin City for a second spell.

2022-2023 season he joined East Fife and made his long await East Fife debut after a long injury comeback against Forfar Athletic at home on 4th March 2023 in a 3-2 victory as a substitute with 10 minutes remaining.

References

External links

1997 births
Living people
Dutch footballers
Dutch people of Iraqi descent
Scottish Professional Football League players
Greenock Morton F.C. players
Elgin City F.C. players
Association football defenders
Annan Athletic F.C. players
Association football wingers
Dutch expatriate footballers
Dutch expatriate sportspeople in Scotland
Partick Thistle F.C. players
SBV Vitesse players
ADO Den Haag players
Dumbarton F.C. players
Stirling Albion F.C. players
Expatriate footballers in Scotland
Alumni of the University of Glasgow Medical School
Footballers from Delft
East Fife F.C. players